Kamitaki may refer to:

Mount Kamitaki, a mountain in the Hidaka Mountains, Hokkaidō, Japan
22736 Kamitaki (1998 SM137), a main-belt asteroid
Nolan Kamitaki, winner of the 2006 Discovery Channel Young Scientist Challenge